This is a list of yearly Carolinas Conference football standings.

Carolinas Conference football standings

Early history (1930–1955)

NAIA (1956–1969)

NAIA Division I (1970–1974)

References

Carolinas Conference
Carolinas Conference
Standings